Krzysztof Wesołowski (born 9 December 1956) is a Polish middle-distance runner. He competed in the men's 3000 metres steeplechase at the 1980 Summer Olympics.

References

1956 births
Living people
Athletes (track and field) at the 1980 Summer Olympics
Polish male middle-distance runners
Polish male steeplechase runners
Olympic athletes of Poland
People from Wałbrzych